Agriophara capnodes is a moth in the family Depressariidae. It was described by Edward Meyrick in 1890. It is found in Australia, where it has been recorded from South Australia.

The wingspan is 23–25 mm. The forewings are fuscous, densely irrorated with dark fuscous. There is a series of faint longitudinal dark marks before the hindmargin. The hindwings are whitish-fuscous, towards the apex somewhat darker.

References

Moths described in 1890
Agriophara
Moths of Australia